Climate First is an unregistered political party in New Zealand. The party is focused on highlighting and addressing the threat of climate change. It also supports a universal basic income.

The party ran a single candidate in the 2017 election, in the Auckland Central electorate. The candidate, Leslie Jones received 55 votes and came seventh. 

The party did not apply for a broadcasting allocation for the 2020 election.

See also
 Climate change in New Zealand

References

External links
 

Political parties established in 2017
2017 establishments in New Zealand